Follow Kadri, Not Your Heart is a 2009 Turkish comedy film, directed by Onur Tan, starring Şafak Sezer as a man who goes on holiday to get over being dumped, only to find his ex at the same hotel.

Plot
Kadri and Cem are very close friends (Kankas or "blood brothers"). After Cem is dumped by his girlfriend Betül, Kadri suggests that he go on a holiday to Antalya to get over it. Eventually Cem meets and falls in love with a girl named Umut. But then Betül and her new boyfriend Hakan show up at the same hotel.

Cast
Şafak Sezer as Kadri
Alp Kırşan as Cem
Esin Civangil as Umut
Eylem Şenkal as Betül
Ahmet Mümtaz Taylan as Güneş
Nesrin Akdağ as Deniz
Sevgi Berna Biber as Aysun
Gülden Avşaroğlu as Şeri
Nurseli Tırışkan as Menejer
Nilgün Belgün as Teyze
Cem Özer as Arçil Naz
Uğur Uludağ as Şota
Ebru Özenden as Beyza

Release

Reception

Box office
The film was the seventh highest grossing Turkish film of 2009 with a total worldwide gross of $2,502,800.

See also 
 2009 in film
 Turkish films of 2009

References

External links
 
 
 

2009 films
2000s Turkish-language films
2009 comedy films
Films set in Turkey
Turkish comedy films